is a pioneer Japanese media artist, known for her experimental video art and film works.

Life and family
Mako Idemitsu was born in Ōta-ku, Japan and is the daughter of Japanese businessman and art collector Sazō Idemitsu, founder of Idemitsu Kōsan. Idemitsu had strained relationships with both her father and mother, and was disinherited and disowned by her father after she chose to live in California. Idemitsu said that he had a Confucian attitude towards women, and embraced a patriarchal view of the role of men and women that led to the belittling of his wife and daughters. She also said that he acted to deny them their individuality and independence. Idemitsu has two sisters; one of them, Takako was a painter once married to prominent art critic, Yoshiaki Tōno.

Idemitsu has two sons from her marriage with Francis, Osamu and Shingo. (Shingo Francis, born 1969, is a painter.)

Early life 
Idemitsu attended Waseda University in Tokyo from 1958 to 1962, where she studied Japanese history in the Faculty of Letters. Idemitsu found her undergraduate education anything but stimulating, often frustrated with misogynistic comments made by her professors. She participated in many extra-curricular events, such as the University's Contemporary Literature Society, and was highly politically-engaged, joining in student demonstrations against the US-Japan Security Treaty of 1960.

New York 
Idemitsu attended Columbia University in New York from 1963 to 1964. Idemitsu had hoped to live in New York City, and had to convince her father to support her graduate studies. She enjoyed the multi-cultural environment of New York and the freedom she had, attending different art events by herself, without the legacy and baggage of her family's ties with the Japanese art scene. She did not manage to stay in New York beyond her graduate studies, and left for Europe soon after her student visa expired.

California 
Idemitsu lived in Santa Monica, Los Angeles from 1965 to 1972. Idemitsu was introduced to Sam Francis, through her father's acquisition of his work, and she married him in 1966. She found that even among the hippies and the liberated counterculture of the 1960s in California, male chauvinism was inescapable, different in nature from that of her homeland, but chauvinism nonetheless. While searching for a role outside that of wife and mother which she had fallen into, she by impulse bought a Super 8 film camera and began her career as a film artist. In 1972 she filmed the Womanhouse started by Judy Chicago and others, in order to create an imagery based on this work. Idemitsu became interested with the Women's Liberation Movement, and understood how film documentation was crucial for the awareness of their activities; her interest in 16mm film cameras ensued. Idemitsu was very aware that her works would not be as legible to English-speaking audiences who did not know Japanese language and culture, even if they showed interest in the work's visual aesthetics.

Tokyo 
Mako Idemitsu returned to Japan with Francis and her sons in 1973, originally planning to stay in Japan for a year. In 1974, when Francis returned to the United States, Idemitsu chose to remain in Japan. The couple would later divorce, with Francis marrying for a fifth time in 1985. Although Idemizu increasingly felt repressed in Tokyo, she realized that her video practice allowed her to express a full spectrum of feelings, much more so than she felt was possible in the United States. It was only upon her return to Japan that she could properly produce her At Santa Monica (1973-5) At Any Place (1975-8) series, using and reflecting on the images she shot of the United States.

Idemitsu began to establish her practice without the label of being Francis' wife in Tokyo, getting involved with other pioneer video artists such as the members of Video Hiroba. In particular, Idemitsu credits Nobuhiro Kawanaka and Kyōko Michishita for helping her learn the technical process of video equipment. Michael Goldberg, a Canadian who co-organized the Video Communication/Do it Yourself Kit symposium and exhibition, became Idemitsu's consistent collaborator and is credited as a Director of Photography for many of her videos. Idemitsu also worked extensively with Yoshimitsu Takahashi to develop her films. Idemitsu was also immersed in the broader Japanese arts scene, collaborating with Yoneyama Mamako after watching her pantomime Housewife's Tango to produce At Any Place 4 (1978). Idemitsu was also involved with Japanese art historians, in particular Kaori Chino, a feminist art historian who encouraged her to write and publish her autobiography.

Practice

Medium 
In the early 1970s, Mako Idemitsu was one of the pioneers of video art. The technical limitations of the equipment at the time had an influence on the direction of her work. Idemitsu first started to work in the United States initially with 8 mm film and then moving onto 16 mm film. She became interested in capturing the mood, quality and interplay of light and shadow. When she switched to working with video, the inability of the video cameras of the time to capture the quality of light, led to the increasing use of narrative in her work. On her return to Japan the cumbersomeness of the equipment and an inability to easily film outdoors led her to  use indoor simgle-camera setups. Idemitsu also produced a limited number of video installations.

Idemtisu's work has often been typified as being inspired by melodramas and diary narration. Critics such as Scott Nygren have attempted to locate Japanese cultural origins within her work, claiming a similarity between her narrative form with Noh theatre.

Themes
Recognized for her feminist beliefs, Mako Idemitsu's work is a reflection not just on gender roles, but also on the nature of personal identity and self in society. She also showed how the modern family in Japan was oppressing the identities of Japanese women. Idemitsu has often cited Simone de Beauvoir as one of her major influences, even creating works such as Kae, Act like a Girl (1993) inspired by de Beauvoir's The Second Sex, "People are not born as women. They become women". Idemitsu also does not shy away from depicting the disconcerting realities of Japanese womanhood, including scenes of domestic abuse, harassment and rape.

Mako Idemitsu's first films were home movies of her sons and of family life. This domestic setting, with the action revolving around family interactions, remains the main theme of her films.

A recurring motif in her works is disembodied forms; the television abstracting torsos, heads or even eyes. These disembodied characters, usually female, may act indifferently to her protagonists or may even actively oppresses them, and can be interpreted both at face value as the mother, daughter, or wife of the protagonist, or as a representation of their inner mind. For example, in Idemitsu's Great Mother trilogy, in as much as they are presented as the protagonist's mothers, these disembodied women also represent the super-ego of the protagonist and are a personification of a lifetime of learned cultural values and societal norms, and are thus an internalized ideal from which the protagonist cannot escape.

Notable works

Film and video

What a Woman Made (1973) 
In Idemitsu's seminal feminist video, the image of a tampon swirling in a toilet bowl slowly appears, as the artist speaks about the troubling roles, responsibilities and expectations of women in a clinical tone. Minimal in composition, What a Woman Made is a candid critique of the treatment of women in Japanese society.

Sam Are You Listening? (1974) 
Commissioned by the American Center Japan, this hour-long documentary video is Idemitsu's intimate portrayal of her then husband, Sam Francis. Idemitsu interviewed 5 people about how they viewed Francis; Taeko Tomioka, Toru Takemitsu, Shuzo Takiguchi, Jiro Takamatsu, and Sazo Idemitsu.

Another Day of A Housewife (1977) 
This video was conceived out of Idemitsu's own frustrations of being a housewife, particularly the endless repetition of routine house chores. Idemitsu portrays her frustration of alienation and surveillance by intervening each domestic scene with a televisual eye.

Shadow Part 1 (1980) & Part 2 (1980), Animus Part 1 (1982) & Part 2 (1982) 
In the Shadow and Animus series, Idemitsu explores Jungian psychoanalytical concepts by manifesting the Shadow and Animus as an additional layer and surface in videos of the Japanese domestic setting. They explore the personification of dreams, projections of mental imagery and the difficultly of living under repressive patriarchy. This series builds upon Idemitsu's earlier work, Inner-man (1972), which was shot on film.

My America, Your America (1980) 
Idemitsu purposes photographs by her collaborator, Akira Kobayashi, to construct an eerie found-image video. Idemitsu balances blatant images of Americana to suggest the journey of a foreigner through these iconic landscapes, continually searching for a place within them to belong. It reflects upon her own diasporic experiences moving from coast to coast.

Kiyoko’s Situation (1989) 
Kiyoko, the middle-aged housewife has repressed the desire to express her identity so long, and now it is coming out with a vengeance. Idemitsu portrays the struggle for housewives to be filial, care for her family's need and pursue their own creative ambitions. This film received awards from Mention Special du Jury category “EXPERIMENTAL” La mondiale de film et videos, Quebec, Canada in 1991, and Prix Procirep Section Fiction, Festival International de Videos et Films, Centre Audivisuel Simone de Beauvoir, Paris, France in 1992.

Installations

Still Life (1993–2000) 
Still Life is a two-channel video installation, with moving images projected onto two gigantic calla lilies placed side by side. On one lily, erect like a phallus, symbol of the male sexual organ, hands pull the petals off a red rose. In the second, the pistil, symbolic of the female essence, is missing. We see a woman imprisoned behind an invisible, transparent wall, begging to be released. There is a woman's voice-over endlessly repeating "Have a good day" and "Welcome home", a chorus echoing the supposed monotony of housewife's existence.

Real? Motherhood (2000) 
Real? Motherhood attacks the myth of maternity. The single-channel installation repurposes Idemitsu's 1960s home movies, projecting images through a glass cradle. The moving images show Idemitsu holding one of her children, a baby suckling, mother and child looking at each other, the baby's innocent smile...... These are interspersed with black-and-white images of the ambiguous expression on the mother's face. Light falling from above onto the glass cradle conveys an impression of sanctity—the cradle is transmuted, for the mother, into an altar. However, Idemitsu insists that this western type of cradle also looks like a coffin, reminding us that "in the midst of life we are in death".

Literary work 
What a Woman Made: Autobiography of a Filmmaker (ホワット·ア·うーまんめいど : ある映像作家の自伝 / Howatto a ūman meido : Aru eizō sakka no jiden), Iwanami Shoten (岩波書店), 2003. Official autobiography written by Idemitsu herself.

White Elephant, Chin Music Press (translation by Juliet Winters Carpenter), 2016. Fiction based on Idemitsu's life.

Selected exhibitions and screenings 

 1974 Nirenoki Gallery, Ginza, Japan. Idemitsu's first solo exhibition.
 1974 "New York Tokyo Video Express" (Curated by Shigeko Kubota), Tenjosajiki, Tokyo, Japan.
 1978 "International Video Festival", Sogetsu-kaikan, Tokyo, Japan
 1978 "Japan Video Art Festival" (Curated by Jorge Glusberg), Centro de Arte y Comunicación, Buenos Aires, Argentina
 1979 "Video from Tokyo, Fukui and Kyoto" (Curated by Barbara London), The Museum of Modern Art, New York, US
 1979 "Japan Avant Garde Film Exhibition", The Centre Georges Pompidou, Paris, France
 1992  "Centre Audiovisuel Simone de Beauvoir International Festival Video and Films", Paris, France. Idemitsu was heavily influence by
 1993 "Identity and Home" (Curated by Barbara London and Sally Berger), The Museum of Modern Art, New York, US.
 1993 "The First Generation, Women and Video,1970–75”, Independent Curators, New York, US.
 2004 "Borderline Cases – Women On The Borderlines", Gallery A.R.T., Tokyo, Japan. A group exhibition featuring and thematising the negotiation of identities for female Asian diaspora artists; Park Young Sook and Yun Suk Nam (South Korea); and Theresa Hak Kyung Cha (Hong Kong).
 2018 "Institute of Asian Performance Art: Tokyo TOKAS Project Vol.1" (Curated by Victor Wang), Tokyo Arts and Space, Tokyo, Japan. A group exhibition with artists who utilised television, Zhang Peili and Park Hyun-ki.

Idemitsu's work has also been included in programmes for film festivals such as the Image Forum (1978, 1984, 1990), Oberhausen Short Film Festival (1993), Singapore International Film Festival (1998).

Collections 

 The Museum of Modern Art, New York, US, started collecting at 1979.
 Long Beach Museum of Art, Long Beach, US, started collecting at 1980.
 National Gallery of Canada, Ottawa, Canada
 Centre Georges Pompidou, Paris, France
 ZKM Centre for Art and Media, Karlsruhe, Germany
 University of Genova, Genova, Italy
 Fukuyama Museum of Art, Fukuyama, Japan
 Hiroshima City Museum of Contemporary Art, Hiroshima, Japan
 Kagoshima University, Kagoshima, Japan
 Kobe Design University, Kobe, Japan
 Mori Art Museum, Tokyo, Japan
 Meiji Gakuin University, Tokyo, Japan
 Miyagi Museum of Art, Miyagi, Japan
 Nagoya City Art Museum, Nagoya, Japan
 National Film Archive of Japan
 Museum of Modern Art, Toyama, Japan
 National Museum of Art, Osaka, Japan
 National Museum of Modern Art, Tokyo, Japan
 Tochigi Prefectural Museum of Fine Arts, Japan
 Tokushima 21st Century Cultural Information Center, Tokushima, Japan
 Tokyo Metropolitan Museum of Photography, Japan
 Ewha Womans University Museum, Seoul, Korea

References

External links

Mako Idemitsu's profile on Collaborative Cataloging Japan, an online database and preservation society for experimental Japanese moving images.

1940 births
Living people
Japanese filmmakers
Feminist filmmakers
Japanese women artists
20th-century Japanese artists
Japanese contemporary artists